Marymount International School Rome is a private, international, Catholic, co-educational day school that follows the American grading system and a part of the Global Network of RSHM Schools which includes 19 Marymount schools in Europe, North America, and South America founded by the Religious of the Sacred Heart of Mary (RSHM). 

The school offers an English-language American and International curriculum from Early Childhood through Grade 12 (ages 2 to 18), a longstanding International Baccalaureate (IB) diploma program and an excellent American High School Diploma, as well as AP courses, and a variety of extracurricular activities, all of which contribute to a vibrant community life that enriches its beautiful 40-acre campus in northern Rome.

Facilities include several science laboratories, two spacious libraries with multi-media centers, art and music studios, an Auditorium, the Early Childhood Center Outdoor Classroom, Garden and Playground, and the Dining Hall in addition to a regulation-size soccer field and several other sports areas.  The one-to-one laptop program in the Secondary School is supported by high-speed Internet connections in the classrooms. Enrichment opportunities are offered across all Grade Levels. 

Marymount is accredited by the International Baccalaureate Organization (IBO), Council of International Schools (CIS) and the Middle States Association (MSA).

References

External links

Marymount International School Rome

American international schools in Italy
International schools in Italy
International schools in Rome
International Baccalaureate schools in Italy
Educational institutions established in 1946
Private schools in Italy
1946 establishments in Italy